Festing is a surname. Notable people with the surname include:

 Andrew Festing (born 1941), English portrait painter
 Edward Robert Festing (1839–1912), English major-general, chemist, and first Director of the Science Museum in London
 Sir Francis Festing (1902–1976), British field marshal
 Sir Francis Worgan Festing (1833–1886), British Royal Marines major-general
 John Festing (1837–1902), English clergyman who became Bishop of St Albans
 Matthew Festing (1949–2021), English Grand Master of the Sovereign Military Order of Malta
 Michael Festing, British research scientist
 Michael Christian Festing (1705–1752), English violinist and composer
 Sally Festing (born 1938), British biographer and poet
 Simon Festing, British activist and executive director of the Research Defence Society

See also 
 Festing penny